Jannine Parawie Weigel (born 30 July 2000), also known by the Thai nickname Ploychompoo, is a Thai singer, songwriter, actress, model, influencer, gamer, ambassador and Youtuber. She is of Eurasian origin.

Early life and education
Weigel was born on 30 July 2000 in Steinfurt, Germany, to a Thai mother and a German father. Her first name, Jannine, was from Hebrew, meaning "Yahweh is gracious". Her middle name, Parawie, means "sunbeam" in Thai. Her Thai nickname, Ploychompoo, means "pink sapphire".

Weigel has three elder brothers, born 1986, 1988 and 1990, respectively. She lived in Steinfurt until her tenth year of age and moved to Bangkok, Thailand, in July 2010.

Weigel attended St Martin kindergarten and Regenborgen Primary School in Steinfurt, Germany until Grade 4 as she moved to Bangkok. In Thailand, she was given homeschooling until Grade 6. She continued her education through distance learning until Grade 9, which she completed in 2014. By way of Advanced Placement, she now undertakes a pre-degree course at the Faculty of Liberal Arts, Sukhothai Thammathirat Open University, where she majors in English. She took a summer course in Berklee College of Music in 2018 whereas she received a scholarship from the college.

Weigel speaks Thai, English and German fluently. She is also studying Mandarin Chinese and Vietnamese.

Weigel is a Christian.

Career

Weigel started working as a model after moving to Bangkok in 2010. The next year, she turned her attention to singing. Following three months of training, she entered a national televised singing contest for children, called Singing Kids, and won third place. From there, she became an artist trainee at GMM Grammy in October 2012 before becoming a full artist under it.

In 2012, during her trainee period, she appeared in the music video of Getsunova's "Klai Khae Nai Khue Klai" (ไกลแค่ไหนคือใกล้, "How Much Further Is It Till I Could Be Near You?"), which brought her to fame. In 2013, she started her YouTube channel where she publishes, amongst other things, her covers of popular songs. Many of the covers went viral and gained many million views.

In 2015, Weigel released her first single, "Chak Din Chak Ngo", followed by a number of original soundtrack songs. In the same year, she was given the main roles in the television series Banlang Mek and the film Senior. In 2016, she issued her second single, "Away". She then released a couple more songs with the company GMM Grammy such as "Because Of You" and "I'm Glad".

She was working on English singles as well. Two EPs were released, namely Genesis and Deep End, marking her first step to international stage. She also released her first German single, Zurück Zu Dir and was invited to sing the song on a Germany award show, Webvideopreis Deutschland.

In the same year, she released a new project, The Black Moon consists of 4 horror short movies with her name credited as executive producer. She then ended her contract with GMM Grammy in June 2018.

Soon after, she signed a contract with Universal Music Singapore and released a song called "Pak Rai Jai Rak". The following year, she was starring as main actress in "Pee Nak", a horror-comedy movie which achieved more than 150 million Baht in Thailand Box Office and released a song called "Words" which led her to be nominated as "Best Southeast Asia Act 2019" in MTV Europe Music Awards Seville.

She had joined a lot of music shows abroad in South Korea, Malaysia, Philippines, Indonesia, and others.

On 6 December 2019, she became the first artist to be signed under a new label, RedRecords, based in Kuala Lumpur, a joint venture between AirAsia Group and Universal Music Group. She released her debut single under the label called "Passcode" on 18 September 2020. "Passcode" was recorded and completed in Malaysia. Produced by Tommy Brown (record producer) and was co-written by Jessie Reyez.

On 21 December 2021, Weigel had announced to Thai media to take legal action against her former label, RedRecords for termination of contract, breach of contract, and claim for damages.

Discography

EPs

Singles

Original soundtracks

As featured artist

Other songs

Filmography

Television series

Films

Awards and nominations

TV shows

References

External links
 
 
 
 
 
 

2000 births
People from Steinfurt
Jannine Weigel
Jannine Weigel
Jannine Weigel
Jannine Weigel
Living people
Jannine Weigel
German people of Thai descent
Jannine Weigel
German Christians
Jannine Weigel